Guy Deghy (born Gedeon Aladar Istvan Deghy; 11 October 1912 – 25 February 1992), was a Hungarian-born actor who appeared largely in British films and television, as in the 5th episode of the first season of  The Saint depicting Inspector Oscar Kleinhaus, also making another appearance as the same character in an episode of the 5th series.

His character, Major Wilhelm Wilner, was also one of the few Germans to survive in Where Eagles Dare (1968). He also appeared on the London stage.

He died in London, England aged 79.

Selected filmography

 Mister Emmanuel (1944) - Police Lieutenant
 Against the Wind (1948) - German Sergeant Major
 The Fake (1953) - Stranger (uncredited)
 The Divided Heart (1954) - Schoolteacher 
 Companions in Crime (1954) 
 The Colditz Story (1955) - German Soldier
 The Constant Husband (1955) - Stromboli
 Little Red Monkey (1955) - Social Club Recreation Director
 All for Mary (1955) - Ski Instructor
 Lost (1956) - Erikkson (uncredited)
 The Steel Bayonet (1957) - Artillery N.C.O.
 Carve Her Name with Pride (1958) - SS Man (uncredited)
 The Mouse That Roared (1959) - Soviet Ambassador (uncredited)
 The House of the Seven Hawks (1959) - Desk Lieutenant
 Follow That Horse! (1960) - German Delegate (uncredited)
 Surprise Package (1960) - Tibor Smolny
 A Matter of WHO (1961) - Ivonovitch
 The Silent Invasion (1962) - Pierre
 Sammy Going South (1963) - Doctor
 The Mouse on the Moon (1963) - Russian Scientist
 Becket (1964) - Minor Role (uncredited)
 Devil Doll (1964) - Hans (uncredited)
 The Comedy Man (1964) - Schuyster
 The Yellow Rolls-Royce (1964) - Mayor
 Operation Crossbow (1965) - Dutch Barge Skipper (uncredited)
 The One Eyed Soldiers (1966) - Harold Schmidt / Zavo
 Spia spione (1967)
 Dark of the Sun (1968) - Delage
 Amsterdam Affair (1968) - Will Munch
 Duffy (1968) - Captain Schallert
 Subterfuge (1968) - Dr. Lundgren
 Where Eagles Dare (1968) - Major Wilhelm Wilner (uncredited)
 Vendetta for the Saint (1969) - Maresciallo
 Before Winter Comes (1969) - Kovacs
 A Walk with Love and Death (1969) - The Priest
 The Looking Glass War (1970) - Fritsche
 The Kremlin Letter (1970) - Professor
 Cry of the Banshee (1970) - Party Guest
 Been Down So Long It Looks Like Up to Me (1971) - Kovacs
 Universal Soldier (1972) - Timmerman
 March or Die (1977) - Ship's Captain
 The Greek Tycoon (1978) - Tablir
 Success Is the Best Revenge (1984) - Angry Old Man

References

External links
 

1912 births
1992 deaths
British male film actors
British male television actors
Hungarian male film actors
Hungarian male television actors
Male actors from Budapest
20th-century British male actors
Hungarian emigrants to the United Kingdom